Irene Edgar (born 21 October 1957) is a Scottish lawn bowler.

Edgar has a visual impairment.

She competed at the 2014 Commonwealth Games where she won a silver medal in the mixed para-sport pairs event. She also competed at the 2018 Commonwealth Games.

References

1957 births
Living people
Scottish female bowls players
Bowls players at the 2014 Commonwealth Games
Bowls players at the 2018 Commonwealth Games
Commonwealth Games silver medallists for Scotland
Commonwealth Games medallists in lawn bowls
Sportspeople with a vision impairment
Medallists at the 2014 Commonwealth Games